is a dam in Suzaka, Nagano Prefecture, Japan, completed in 1994. It is located on the Dodo River, immediately upstream from the Haino Dam.

References 

Dams in Nagano Prefecture
Dams completed in 1994